Big Island 37 is a First Nations reserve on Big Island in Lake of the Woods. It is one of the reserves of the Animakee Wa Zhing 37 First Nation.

References

External links
 Canada Land Survey System

Anishinaabe reserves in Ontario
Communities in Rainy River District
Lake of the Woods